Argentina competed at the 1996 Summer Olympics in Atlanta, United States. 178 competitors, 131 men and 47 women, took part in 101 events in 20 sports.

Medalists

Athletics

Men

Women

Basketball

Men's tournament

Squad

|}
| valign="top" |
 Head coach
 Guillermo Vecchio
 Assistant coaches
 Rubén Magnano
 Fernando Duró
|}
Preliminary round

9th to 12th place classification

9th place classification

Boxing

Key:
 RSC – Referee stopped contest

Canoeing

Flatwater

Cycling

Mountain bike

Road

Track
Pursuits

Points races

Key

 DNF – Did not finish
 OVT – Overtaken

Equestrian

Fencing

Field hockey

Men

Team roster and tournament statistics
Coach: Miguel MacCormick

Legend:         

Preliminary Round (Pool A)

 Qualified for semifinals

9th to 12th place classification

9th place match

Women

Team roster and tournament statistics
Coach: Rodolfo Mendoza

Preliminary Round

Football

Squad
Over aged players are marked with * (max 3).
Matches played in parenthesis denotes player came from the bench.

Results
Preliminaries

Quarterfinals

Semifinals

Gold Medal match

 Silver Medal

Gymnastics

Artistic

Judo

Men

Women

Rowing

Men

Women

Sailing

Men

Women

Key
 DSQ – Disqualified
 PMS – Premature start

Shooting

Men

Women

Swimming

Men

Women

Tennis

Men

Women

Volleyball

Beach

Indoor

Roster

Coach: Alberto Armoa

Group play

|}

Quarterfinal

5th to 8th place classification

8th place match

Weightlifting

Women

Key

 DNQ – Did not qualify

Wrestling

See also
Argentina at the 1995 Pan American Games

References

Olympics
Nations at the 1996 Summer Olympics
1996 Summer Olympics